Green Spring or Green Springs may refer to:

Green Spring
Green Spring, Kentucky
Green Spring, West Virginia
Green Spring Gardens Park near Washington, D.C.
Green Spring Plantation, home of colonial governor William Berkeley in James City County, Virginia, now part of Colonial National Historical Park
 The Battle of Green Spring during the American Revolutionary War (1781)

Green Springs
Alabama State Route 149 partly follows Green Springs Highway, an interstate highway located in Jefferson County, Alabama 
Green Springs, California, former town in El Dorado County
Green Springs Highway, Oregon Route 66, between Ashland and Klamath Falls 
Green Springs National Historic Landmark District in Louisa County, Virginia
Green Springs, Ohio, in Sandusky County and Seneca County
Green Springs Park, park and artesian spring in Enterprise, Florida
Green Springs (Trevilians, Virginia), a historic house in Louisa County, Virginia

See also

Greene Springs, Missouri, USA; a ghost town
 Spring Green (disambiguation)

 Spring (disambiguation)
 Green (disambiguation)